Salat al-jama‘ah (Congregational Prayer) or prayer in congregation (jama'ah) is considered to have more social and spiritual benefit than praying by oneself. When praying in congregation, the people stand in straight parallel rows behind the chosen imam, facing qibla. The imam, who leads the congregation in salat, is usually chosen to be a scholar or the one who has the best knowledge of the Qur'an, preferably someone who has memorised it in its entirety (a hafiz) . 
In the first row behind the Imam, if available, would be another hafiz to correct the Imam in case a mistake is made during the performance of the salat. The prayer is performed as normal, with the congregation following the actions and movements of the imam as he performs the salat.

Requirements for the imam
The congregational prayer is led by an imam. The imam should be male, just, and well aware of Islamic jurisprudence. The Imaam stands in front by himself while the followers stand behind him in straight lines, all facing the Qiblah (the direction of Ka’bah). The most worthy of leading people in prayer is the one who is the best in memorizing and reciting the Quran. If they are equal, then the one who has the deepest knowledge of Sunnah. If they still are equal in the knowledge of Sunnah, then the oldest of the group. The Messenger of Allah  said: “The most versed in recitation of the Book of Allah leads the people in the prayer. If they are equal, then the one most aware of the Sunnah. If they all are equal, the one who emigrated earlier. If they all are equal, then the oldest of them.” [Muslim]

Conditions of the imam
Imam of the Congregational Prayer should have special conditions: 
male 
Intellect.
 just.
 mature (Baligh/Adult).
 being a Muslim.

Conditions
 There are not any obstacles between Imam jamaat and prayers or prayers and other prayers.
 The minimum number of people required for the Congregational Prayer to be valid is two.
 In the Congregational Prayer, Imam will read Surah Al-Fatiha and then any surah of the Quran aloud except for zuhr and Asr prayer. People praying behind the Imam should keep silent during the Fatihah. They should, however, individually read all the other things in salah apart from fatihah.

Narrations 
Muhammad (peace be upon him) himself never omitted even a single congregational prayer. Even in his sickness, it was strenuous for him to walk; nonetheless, with the aid of two of his companions he came (while his auspicious feet were dragging on the ground) to the mosque and prayed with the congregation.

Congregation prayer in a mosque, or masjid, is particularly encouraged for men and is optional for women. Muslim men are encouraged to offer as many of the five daily prayers in the mosque as possible, as the reward for doing so is at least 27 times greater than offering the prayer alone at home.

Some benefits of congregational prayer
Congregational prayer has worldly and otherworldly benefits:
 Islamic equality
 Unity
 love and Collaboration
 Discipline
 validity of Islam
 endless Reward

See also

 Dua
 Du'a Kumayl
 Sabr
 Tasbih
 Sujud Sahwi
 Sujud Tilawa

References

Further reading
 
  How to pray according to Shi'a Ja'fari School of law

External links

 Prayer Tutorial, Prayer Times and Qibla directions
 E-Book: Salaah - A Detailed Guide to Prayer
 iPhone app "alQibla" for worldwide prayer timings and qibla direction from anywhere on earth
 Determining time of Salat anywhere
 Salat presentation in video, including how to perform salat in detail
 Worldwide prayer time calculation
 Java library to calculate prayer time

 
Salah terminology